International Observe the Moon Night is an annual public outreach event sponsored by the Lunar Reconnaissance Orbiter mission, the Solar System Exploration Division at NASA's Goddard Space Flight Center, and other NASA and astronomical organizations that encourages observation, appreciation, and understanding of the Moon and its connection to planetary science and exploration. Everyone on Earth is invited to join the celebration by hosting or attending an event or participating as a lunar observer — and uniting on one day each year to look at and learn about the Moon together.  First organized in 2010, there are usually over 500 events annually in over 40 countries, hosted by universities, observatories, NASA Centers, schools, museums, parks, libraries, and amateur astronomers.  Some events are offered both in person and via internet streaming video. The date is selected to enhance visibility of lunar topography.

History 
The event grew out of two events during the International Year of Astronomy, 2009: "We're at the Moon!", sponsored by the Lunar Reconnaissance Orbiter and Lunar Crater Observation and Sensing Satellite teams to celebrate the arrival of the LRO and LCROSS at the Moon, and "National Observe the Moon Night" in the US.

Dates:
 Saturday, 2009-08-01 (We're at the Moon and National Observe the Moon Night)
 Saturday, 2010-09-18
 Saturday, 2011-10-08
 Saturday, 2012-09-22
 Saturday, 2013-10-12
 Saturday, 2014-09-06
 Saturday, 2015-09-19
 Saturday, 2016-10-08
 Saturday, 2017-10-28
 Saturday, 2018-10-20
 Saturday, 2019-10-05
 Saturday, 2020-09-26
 Saturday, 2021-10-16
 Saturday, 2022-10-01

Organizers
 Lunar Reconnaissance Orbiter
 NASA Solar System Exploration Research Virtual Institute
 Planetary Science Institute
 Lunar and Planetary Institute
 CosmoQuest
 Science Festival Alliance
 NASA Night Sky Network
 Astronomical Society of the Pacific

References

Science festivals